Kurorta is a rural locality (a selo) in Gafuriysky District, Krasnoulsky Selsoviet, Bashkortostan, Russia. The population was 598 as of 2010. There are 6 streets.

Geography 
Kurorta is located 7 km northeast of Krasnousolsky (the district's administrative centre) by road. Krasnousolsky is the nearest rural locality.

References 

Rural localities in Gafuriysky District